The 3rd Reims Grand Prix was a Formula One motor race, held on July 1, 1962, at the Reims-Gueux circuit, near Reims in France. The race was run over 50 laps of the 8.302 km circuit and was won by New Zealand driver Bruce McLaren in a Cooper T60.

Reims-Gueux hosted the French Grand Prix under Grand Prix regulations in 1932, 1938 and 1939 due to the popularity of the Grand Prix de la Marne, a Grand Prix racing series dating back to 1925. Post war changes in political and financial structures moved the 1962 Grand Prix de France to the Rouen-Les-Essarts circuit. Reims secured a separate non-championship Formula One event instead. Most of the Formula One teams entered the competition except for Ferrari and Porsche.

Results

References

External links 
 "The Formula One Record Book", John Thompson, 1974, pp. 96–97
 Aiden Cooper T59 Climax (photos)

Reims Grand Prix
Reims Grand Prix